Anandha Kannan (23 March 1973 – 16 August 2021) was a Singaporean actor and television host, popularly known for his theatre works and shows broadcast in Singapore and Sun Network.

Early life and family 
Anandha Kannan was born on 23 March 1973 in Singapore to Govindaraju and Vasanthakumari.

Kannan married Rani Kanna and have one daughter.

Career 
Kannan’s career started with Vasantham as an actor and host. During his teenage years, he acted in radio dramas like Siruvar Medai and hosted TV shows like Siruvargal Naangal. He had a keen interest in the theatre scene from a young age and became famous for performing in Ravindran Drama Group’s (RDG) productions and later in local television dramas. In 1988, his role as one of the main characters in RDG’s Kudubathin Araigal earned the appreciation of many theatergoers.  He won the Best Actor Award for Indian Cultural Month in 1990. He gave the prize money to RDG to enable it to produce more plays.

Kannan moved to Chennai and joined Sun Music as a video jockey in the 2000s. It brought him fame and helped him broaden his audience base. He acted in a children’s drama called Sindubad on Sun TV which earned him many young fans. He also acted in Tamil films like the science-fiction Adhisaya Ulagam ( 2012). On Vasantham, Kannan hosted programmes such as Maalai Mathuram, Amali Thumali, Oorkuruvi and Suvai and the gameshow Savaal Singapore (2013 to 2018) which is a Tamil version of We Are Singaporeans. In 2011, he won the Best Host award at the station’s awards show Pradhana Vizha. He also  received the  International  Youth  Icon award at the World Universities Tamil Conference in 2013. With the support of the National Arts Council, Kannan went to India in 2017 to study Tamil folk theatre from the renowned teacher Na Muthuswamy.

He started AK Theatre Ltd, a non-profit organisation, in 2013 to keep Indian culture alive among the younger generation. It produces performances that celebrate traditional Tamil forms of theatre such as Koothu, karagam, kummi, parai and villupattu. He also organised cultural and language festivals, stage productions, workshops and competitions free of charge, to benefit many students of folk arts. AK Theatre launched the Anandha Koothu, a diploma course in Indian musical theatre, in affilia-tion with the University of West London in 2019 to encourage youngsters and young  adults.  It is an internationally accredited art enrichment programme on traditional arts and theatre forms.

He also acted as lead in Mullum Malarum with his co-host Prajin and Ithanai Naalai Engirunthai with Manochitra but both were never released to audiences. He also made guest appearance in Venkat Prabu movie Saroja. He was also famous for being brand ambassador of Naturals Spa & Salon.

Filmography

Television

Awards & Recognitions 

 Awarded as "International Youth Icon"  at  World Universities Tamil Conference 2013.
 Television Actors Guild Award (South India) for "Best Actor"
Tamil Sudar Award, AK Theatre Limited, Awarded by Mediacorp 2019

Awards & Recognition at Pradhana Vizha as follows,

Death 
Anandha Kannan died at the Singapore General Hospital died on 16 August 2021 at the age of 48 due to bile-duct cancer.

References 

1973 births
2021 deaths
21st-century Indian male actors
Indian male television actors
Male actors in Tamil cinema